The Bridge of Hope is a concrete girder bridge that spans the Mississippi River between Sartell, Minnesota and Sauk Rapids, Minnesota. The bridge was completed eight months early, aided by favorable weather and trouble-free construction.  It was built in 1995 and was designed by Minnesota Department of Transportation and the Jim Hill Group.

The bridge is named in honor of Jacob Wetterling, a boy who was abducted from St. Joseph, Minnesota in 1989 (his remains were discovered in 2016).  The name was chosen by a group of high school students who wanted to memorialize Wetterling and other missing children.

See also
List of crossings of the Upper Mississippi River

References
 

Road bridges in Minnesota
Bridges over the Mississippi River
Bridges completed in 1995
1995 establishments in Minnesota
Concrete bridges in the United States
Girder bridges in the United States
Buildings and structures in Benton County, Minnesota